Murukku  Tamil – முறுக்கு) is a savoury, crunchy snack originating from the Indian subcontinent. The name murukku derives from the Tamil word for "twisted", which refers to its shape. In India, murukku is especially common in the states of Andhra Pradesh, Tamil Nadu, Karnataka, and Kerala. It is called murkulu or janthukulu in Andhra Pradesh. It is also common in countries with substantial Indian and Sri Lankan diaspora communities, including Singapore, Fiji, Malaysia, and Myanmar (Burma). Murukku, called sagalay gway in Burmese, is a common snack and is used as a topping for a regional dish called dawei mont di.

Murukku is typically made from rice flour and urad dal flour. Chakli is a similar dish, typically made with an additional ingredient, Bengal gram (chickpea) flour.

It is the origin of the Tamil saying  ('toothless grandfather wants murukku'), meaning someone wants something they cannot use; murukku is very hard and can actually break teeth and orthodontic devices.

Ingredients and preparation

Murukku is typically made from rice and urad dal (lentil) flour. The flours are mixed with water, salt, chilli powder, asafoetida and either sesame seeds or cumin seeds. The mix is kneaded into a dough, which is shaped into spiral or coil shapes either by hand or extruded using a mould. The spirals are then deep fried in vegetable oil.

Varieties

The dish has many variations, resulting from the types and proportions of flours used. Mullu Muruku has an uneven texture that gives it an extra crunch. 'Mullu' refers to thorns in Tamil and the snack derives its name from this. The Kai Murukku (literally, "hand murukku") is made by hand using a stiffer dough. Pakoda murukku is another ribbon-shaped variety of the snack. Attayampatti Kai Murukku, a town in Tamil Nadu, is known for its unique variety of murukkus, known as Manapparai murukku. This Manapparai murukku got famous because of Mr. Krishnan Iyer who prepared and sold this first in Manapparai. In 2010, the Tamil Nadu government applied for a geographical indication tag for Manapparai Murukku.

Gallery

Some of the murukku varieties include:

 Kai murkku (Hand-woven murkku) 
 Manapaarai murukku
 Mullu murukku or Magizhampoo murukku 
 Thenkuzhal murukku  (Skinny murukku)
 Oosi thenkuzhal murukku (Skinny murukku)
 Coconut milk murukku (Thengaaippaal murukku ) 
 Godhumai murukku (Wheat murukku)
 Omapodi
 Kaara murukku (Spicy murukku)
 Poondu murukku (Garlic murukku)
 Meen murruku (Fish-thorn shaped murukku)
 Vattavruralai murukku (Ring murukku)
 Vennai murukku (Butter murukku)
 Kadalai Murukku (Besan murukku)
 Arisi murukku (Rice murukku)
 Achchu murukku or Achchappam (Sweet murukku)
 Pudhina Murukku (Mint murukku)
 Ezhumichai murukku(Lemon murukk)
 Kelvaragu murukku (Ragi murukku)
 Thirunelveli manoharam
 Urulaikkizhangu murkku (Potato murukku)
 Ulundhu murukku
 Nei murukku (Ghee murukku)
 Ravai murukku
 Pulungal arisi murukku

See also 
 Jhilinga, a similar Nepalese dish made from rice flour
 Manapparai Murukku
 Chakli

References

External links
 

Tamil cuisine
Legume dishes
Articles containing video clips
Indian snack foods